Cle Elum-Roslyn High School is a public high school located in Cle Elum, Washington. It serves 280 students in grades 9–12. 88% of the students are white, while 4% are Hispanic, 3% are Asian, 2% are American Indian and 2% are two or more races.

Notable people
Douglas A. Munro, USCG, Medal of Honor recipient

References

External links
Cle Elum–Roslyn School District

Public high schools in Washington (state)
High schools in Kittitas County, Washington